During the 1894–95 season Hibernian, a football club based in Edinburgh, finished first out of 10 clubs in the Scottish Second Division.

Scottish Second Division

Final League table

Scottish Cup

See also
List of Hibernian F.C. seasons

References

External links
Hibernian 1894/1895 results and fixtures, Soccerbase

Hibernian F.C. seasons
Hibernian